The Leica X Vario is a digital large sensor compact camera announced by Leica Camera on June 11, 2013.

Its specifications are largely identical to the earlier Leica X2, with the exception of the 18-46 mm zoom lens (28-70 mm equivalent angle of view (AOV) in 35 mm full frame format) where the X2 has a fixed focal length (prime) lens.

References
http://www.dpreview.com/products/leica/compacts/leica_xvario/specifications
http://www.dpreview.com/articles/8430983422/leica-announces-x-vario-zoom-compact-with-apsc-sensor

X Vario
Cameras introduced in 2013